S. lutea may refer to:

 Salix lutea, a willow native to North America
 Salpistele lutea, a Panamanian orchid
 Saponaria lutea, an Old World plant
 Sarcina lutea, a gram-positive bacterium
 Scorpaena lutea, a venomous fish
 Scrobipalpa lutea, a twirler moth
 Sicalis lutea, a South American bird
 Sillago lutea, a marine fish
 Siphona lutea, a tachina fly
 Sparganothina lutea, an Ecuadorian moth
 Spilarctia lutea, an Asian moth
 Spondias lutea, a plant native to the tropical Americas
 Stelis lutea, an epiphytic orchid
 Sternbergia lutea, a plant with yellow flowers
 Streptocarpus lutea, an Afrotropical plant
 Striga lutea, a hemiparasitic plant
 Stromanthe lutea, a plant native to the tropical Americas
 Strongylophthalmyia lutea, a long-legged fly
 Strymon lutea, a scrub hairstreak
 Styposis lutea, a tangle-web spider
 Syncopacma lutea, a twirler moth